Chilevisión Noticias (Chilevision News) is the branding of news programmes on the Chilean television network Chilevisión, since March 25, 1996. Its flagship program is the daily evening newscast CHV Noticias Central presented by Daniel Matamala and Macarena Pizarro, broadcast every day at 9:00pm in continental territory and 7:00pm in Easter Island, it features a review of eighty-five minutes of only national and sports news. Other programmes include a morning magazine, an Afternoon edition and finally a midnight news-talk show.

Presenters

Contigo CHV Noticias AM 
 Montserrat Álvarez.
 Roberto Cox.

CHV Noticias Tarde 
 Karina Alvarez.
 Matilde Burgos.
 Viviana Encina

CHV Noticias Central 
 Mónica Rincon.
 Macarena Pizarro.
 Daniel Matamala.
 Humberto Sichel

References

External links 
  

1996 Chilean television series debuts
Chilean television news shows
Chilevisión original programming
1990s Chilean television series
2000s Chilean television series
2010s Chilean television series
Flagship evening news shows
Spanish-language television shows